Stalida (Greek: Σταλίδα, older form Stalis) is a village that lies between Malia and Hersonissos on the north coast of Crete, Greece. The name derives from the Greek verb stalizo, which means 'stop for a rest' as this was a location where shepherds and farms rested in between villages. It is a lively resort, attracting tourists from many European countries. It has a long, sandy beach and a variety of shops, bars and tavernas. From Stalis, the Bulgarian trail leads to Mochos village, built by the captive Bulgarians during WWII. In the village's main square, one finds the Byzantine church of St. Ioannis (St. John) dating back to 1600. Popular with families, it is 30 km from Nikos Kazantsakis airport in Heraklion.

Resort
Quieter than the neighbouring resorts of Malia and Hersonissos, Stalis has a more relaxed atmosphere and still has a wide array of bars and restaurants. The resort is popular with a mix of nationalities.

Gallery

References

External links
 Stalis website

Populated places in Heraklion (regional unit)